The 2018 China Open (officially known as the Victor China Open 2018 for sponsorship reasons) was a badminton tournament which took place at Olympic Sports Center Xincheng Gymnasium in Changzhou, Jiangsu, China, from 18 to 23 September 2018. It had a total prize of $1,000,000.

Tournament
The 2018 China Open was the seventeenth tournament of the 2018 BWF World Tour and also part of the China Open championships, which had been held since 1986. This tournament was organized by Chinese Badminton Association, and sanctioned by the BWF.

Venue
This international tournament was held at Olympic Sports Center Xincheng Gymnasium in Changzhou, Jiangsu, China.

Point distribution
Below is the point distribution table for each phase of the tournament based on the BWF points system for the BWF World Tour Super 1000 event.

Prize money
The total prize money for this tournament was US$1,000,000. Distribution of prize money was in accordance with BWF regulations.

Men's singles

Seeds

 Viktor Axelsen (second round)
 Shi Yuqi (semi-finals)
 Kento Momota (final)
 Son Wan-ho (quarter-finals)
 Chou Tien-chen (semi-finals)
 Chen Long (quarter-finals)
 Srikanth Kidambi (quarter-finals)
 Ng Ka Long (quarter-finals)

Finals

Top half

Section 1

Section 2

Bottom half

Section 3

Section 4

Women's singles

Seeds

 Tai Tzu-ying (first round)
 Akane Yamaguchi (semi-finals)
 P. V. Sindhu (quarter-finals)
 Ratchanok Intanon (first round)
 Chen Yufei (final)
 Carolina Marín (champion)
 He Bingjiao (quarter-finals)
 Nozomi Okuhara (semi-finals)

Finals

Top half

Section 1

Section 2

Bottom half

Section 3

Section 4

Men's doubles

Seeds

 Marcus Fernaldi Gideon / Kevin Sanjaya Sukamuljo (semi-finals)
 Li Junhui / Liu Yuchen (quarter-finals)
 Takeshi Kamura / Keigo Sonoda (first round)
 Liu Cheng / Zhang Nan (first round)
 Mathias Boe / Carsten Mogensen (withdrew)
 Mads Conrad-Petersen / Mads Pieler Kolding (first round)
 Takuto Inoue / Yuki Kaneko (first round)
 Kim Astrup / Anders Skaarup Rasmussen (champions)

Finals

Top half

Section 1

Section 2

Bottom half

Section 3

Section 4

Women's doubles

Seeds

 Yuki Fukushima / Sayaka Hirota (quarter-finals)
 Misaki Matsutomo / Ayaka Takahashi (champions)
 Chen Qingchen / Jia Yifan (quarter-finals)
 Greysia Polii / Apriyani Rahayu (semi-finals)
 Shiho Tanaka / Koharu Yonemoto (quarter-finals)
 Jongkolphan Kititharakul / Rawinda Prajongjai (first round)
 Lee So-hee / Shin Seung-chan (second round)
 Mayu Matsumoto / Wakana Nagahara (final)

Finals

Top half

Section 1

Section 2

Bottom half

Section 3

Section 4

Mixed doubles

Seeds

 Zheng Siwei / Huang Yaqiong (champions)
 Wang Yilü / Huang Dongping (semi-finals)
 Tontowi Ahmad / Liliyana Natsir (second round)
 Tang Chun Man / Tse Ying Suet (semi-finals)
 Zhang Nan / Li Yinhui (final)
 Mathias Christiansen / Christinna Pedersen (quarter-finals)
 Goh Soon Huat / Shevon Jemie Lai (first round)
 Chris Adcock / Gabrielle Adcock (second round)

Finals

Top half

Section 1

Section 2

Bottom half

Section 3

Section 4

References

External links
 Tournament Link

China Open (badminton)
China Open (badminton)
China Open (badminton)
China Open (badminton)